Hayatullah is a male Muslim given name, composed of the elements Hayat and Allah. It may refer to

Qazi Syed Hayatullah (died ca. 1722), Muslim scholar of Fiqh from Haryana, India
Hayatullah Khan Durrani (born 1962), Pakistani cave explorer, mountaineer, environmentalist, and rescuer; also a part-time TV sports presenter
Hayatullah Khan (journalist) (1976–2006), Pakistani journalist
Hayatullah (detainee) (born 1979), Afghan detained in Bagram
Hayatullah (Tehreek-e-Taliban leader), Pakistani
Hayatullah Khan (Taliban leader)
Hayatullah (Afghan cricketer), Afghan cricketer
Hayatullah (Pakistani cricketer) (born 2000), Pakistani cricketer

Arabic masculine given names